French corvette Fraternité was a  Naïade-class brig-corvette launched in 1793. She had a brief sailing career. In May 1795, she was renamed Festin. She then served in a number of non-operational roles until she was struck in 1813.

Sea service
Lloyd's List reported on 29 July 1794 that Fraternité had captured , Mill, master, off Cape Clear as Boyne was sailing from Liverpool for Africa to gather slaves. Fraternité was armed with twelve 18-pounder guns and six swivel guns; she had a crew of 146 men.

Later service
In May 1795 Fraternité was renamed Festin. In July 1804 she was a barracks hulk at Brest. She was recommissioned in June 1806 at Brest as a training and station ship and re-rated a brig-corvette. In 1808 she was described as a brig. In January 1812 she served as an annex to the naval school ship . She received a third mast for training duties.

Fate
Festin grounded in Brest harbour on 13 June 1813. Although there was little damage, she was struck from the lists.

See also
 French corvette Naïade (1793)
 French corvette Diligente (1794)

Citations

References
 
 

1793 ships
Ships built in France
Age of Sail corvettes of France
Maritime incidents in 1813